José Vazquez may refer to:

 José Manuel Vázquez Yebra (1928–2001), Spanish politician and lawyer
 José Vazquez (footballer) (born 1940), Argentine footballer
 José Vázquez (baseball) (born 1970), American baseball coach and former catcher
 Jose Vazquez-Cofresi (born 1975), American conga drummer and musician
 José Juan Vázquez (born 1988), Mexican footballer

See also
José Vásquez (disambiguation)